Pullancheri Juma Masjid is a local juma masjid of Pullancheri of Manjeri, Kerala state of India.

This masjid was built in the 1920s. There are 5 srambis under this masjid.

This masjid is governed by Hidayathul Islam Sangham Committee. President of Hidayathul Islam Sangham is Sayed Hyderali Shihab Thangal of Panakkad.

Nusrathul Islam Madrasa, Pullancheri is run under this masjid.

Manjeri
Mosques in Kerala
Mosques completed in the 1920s
Religious buildings and structures in Malappuram district
Pullancheri
20th-century architecture in India